The 1954 Wisconsin Badgers football team represented the University of Wisconsin in the 1954 Big Ten Conference football season.

Season
Senior Alan Ameche earned All-America honors, was named the Big 10 Player of the Year, and was the recipient of the 1954 Heisman Trophy, becoming the first Badger to win the award. He played linebacker on defense along with fullback on offense, since American football was single platoon during his college career. In four years as a Badger, he gained 3,212 yards, then the NCAA record, scored 25 touchdowns, and averaged 4.8 yards per carry.

Schedule

Awards and honors
Alan Ameche, Heisman Trophy
Alan Ameche, All-America honors

Team players in the 1955 NFL Draft

References

Wisconsin
Wisconsin Badgers football seasons
Wisconsin Badgers football